David Jensen (born 1950) is a Canadian-born British radio disc jockey.

David Jensen may also refer to:

David Jensen (sculptor) (1816–1902), Danish-born Russian sculptor
David Jensen (ice hockey, born 1961), American ice hockey player who played for the Minnesota North Stars
David Jensen (ice hockey, born 1965), American ice hockey player who played for the Hartford Whalers and Washington Capitals
David Jensen (footballer) (born 1992), Danish goalkeeper